The 2006 UEFA Women's Cup Final was a two-legged final match played on 20 and 27 May 2006 between Turbine Potsdam and Frankfurt, both of Germany. This was the first final to be contested by teams of the same country. It was also the first ever final not to feature a Swedish team. Frankhurt won the final 7–2 on aggregate.

Match details

First leg

Second leg

Women's Cup
Uefa Women's Cup Final 2006
2006
UEFA
UEFA